

Final standings

ACC tournament
See 1961 ACC men's basketball tournament

NCAA tournament

Round of 24
Wake Forest 97, St John's 74

Regional semi-finals
Wake Forest 78, St Bonaventure 73

Regional finals
Saint Joseph's 96, Wake Forest 86

ACC's NCAA record
2–1

NIT
League rules prevented ACC teams from playing in the NIT, 1954–1966

External links
 https://web.archive.org/web/19990902035557/http://www.sportsstats.com/bball/standings/1961